Beech Creek National Scenic Area is a federally designated National Scenic Area within Ouachita National Forest. The  scenic area is administered by the U.S. Forest Service, a part of the U.S. Department of Agriculture. The scenic area includes  of hiking trails, some on former roads. The original designated area, the Beech Creek Botanical Area, remains, conserving mature beech trees near the headwaters of Beech Creek.

Trail ratings
The U. S. Forest Service rates the trails as follows:
Beech Creek Trail  generally follows Beech Creek, sometimes at the edge and sometimes farther away.
Turkey Snout Loop follows a small tributary of Beech Creek, over relatively rugged terrain. It is not recommended for inexperienced backpackers.
Walnut Mountain Loop is suitable for experienced backpackers.
Blue Bouncer Loop is the most difficult hike and is recommended for experienced backpackers.

Facilities
There are no restrooms along the trails nor are there any campsites. Campsites exist at Billy Creek and at Winding Stair Mountain National Recreation Area. Motorized vehicles and either pack or saddle animals are prohibited on the trails. Mountain bikes are not prohibited, but may be difficult to use, because the trails are very narrow. Roads are all covered with gravel

References

External links
 Beech Creek National Scenic Area & Botanical Area at Ouachita National Forest

Ouachita National Forest
National scenic areas
Protected areas of Oklahoma
Protected areas established in 1988
Geography of Le Flore County, Oklahoma
1988 establishments in Oklahoma